The San Antonio Spurs started playing in the NBA in 1976. They started drafting NBA players for first time in the 1977 NBA draft. In total, they have had 157 NBA draft picks.

Key

NBA Draft picks

References

 
National Basketball Association draft
draft history